Taphrina potentillae is a species of fungus in the family Taphrinaceae. A plant pathogen,  it infects the flowers and leaves of species of the genera Potentilla and Parageum. The species was first described under the name Exoascus deformans var. potentillae by American botanist William Farlow in 1883.

References

External links

Fungal plant pathogens and diseases
Taphrinomycetes
Fungi described in 1883